Road signs in Australia are regulated by each state's government, but are standardised overall throughout the country.  In 1999, the National Transport Commission, or NTC, created the first set of Rules of the Road for Australia. Official road signs by standard must use the AS1744 series fonts, based on the USA's Highway Gothic typeface.

Australia closely follows the United States when it comes to road sign designing practices (for example, using yellow diamonds for warning signs and green direction signs), but some types of road signs in Australia, such as road signs for roadworks, "reduce speed" signs, and chevron arrow-styled direction signs are influenced by the usage in the United Kingdom.

History 
The very first standardised road signs in Australia used yellow circular signs as regulatory signs, a feature now preserved in "pedestrian crossing" and "safety zone" signs.

In 1964, Australia adopted a variation of the American Manual on Uniform Traffic Control Devices (MUTCD) road sign design, which is a modified version of the 1954 revised version of the 1948 American edition of the MUTCD. The Australian adopted version had differences from the American version that it used red "give way" signs instead of yellow "yield" signs, "no entry" instead of "do not enter", round pedestrian crossing road signs (a carryover from the early days), the adoption of some road signage designs from the United Kingdom, and the use of imperial system of units (miles and yards) as in the UK as opposed to the customary system of units (miles and feet) in the US. Australia was the only country outside of North America (excluding the American territories) that had speed limit signs in MUTCD style.

The year of 1974 saw important changes in Australia's road sign design practices. A major change expressed Australia's preference for a transition to adoption of symbols on signs in lieu of words, inspired by the Vienna Convention on Road Signs and Signals, and transition to adoption of kilometres and metres in lieu of miles and yards. This change aligned with Australia's large-scale adoption of the metric system. Australian speed limit signs with red circle as a legend were placed in numbers greater than the numbers on those containing the legend "SPEED LIMIT". Speedometers on Australian vehicles were not required but encouraged to alter or replace the speedometer part so that it is shown in kilometres per hour. Except for bridge-clearance and flood-depth signs, dual marking was not used.

To avoid confusion as to whether the distance indicated was in miles or kilometres new major distance signs had affixed to them a temporary yellow plate showing the symbol km. On the many new kilometre signs on minor roads, a yellow plate which showed the corresponding number of miles was affixed under the now permanent kilometre distance indication. These temporary plates were removed between 1975 and 1976.

Since 1974, Australia had the notable distinction of keeping the text-based low clearance warning sign, as most countries around the world now use symbolic versions. If further research on Australian road signage is given, the text-based low clearance sign would be gone before the 2030s.

Regulatory signs 
Regulatory signs inform drivers of traffic laws and banned actions. Road users must obey all instructions on prohibitory signs or risk getting a fine and points deducted from their licence. Local councils may have local restrictions relating to parking times, which would be shown on or near the sign.

Combo signs

Warning signs 
Warning signs let drivers know that road changes are coming up on the drive. These can be permanent or temporary traffic hazards and obstacles. They use the yellow diamond design.

Guide and information signs 
Guide and information signs give directions and information for scenic tourist routes and destinations such as rest stops and fuel stations. They also provide additional traffic information to guide driving.

Guide and information signs on expressways

Route markers 
Please note that some plates have reduced due to the changing to alphanumeric plates in several states. Queensland has been partially alphanumeric, replacing all but around one metroad (because it is not applicable as M) with M roads, while New South Wales also had metroads but they were all replaced with straight alphanumeric plates along with national roads. Victoria is alphanumeric but partially alphanumeric in the metropolitan area of Melbourne.

Hazard markers 
Hazard markers indicate the direction to take when approaching the obstacle or driving past the hazard. Drivers must obey these signs.

Roadwork signs 
Roadwork signs to keep you informed of changing conditions and to keep road workers safe. These signs closely follow United Kingdom design.

Traffic lights

For traffic

For crosswalk

For special vehicles 
The traffic lights for special vehicles have a letter on it. The GO light is white instead of green.

Road markings

Raised markers 
Australia specifies four colours of raised markers:
  White: The default colour for lane lines.
  Red: The colour used to augment the left hand edge lines.
  Yellow: Augments the dividing lines, right-hand edge lines of one-way carriageways, the outline of traffic islands and on painted medians.
  Blue: Used to mark the location of a fire hydrant.

Retired signs

Retired combo signs

Retired route markers

Early road signs

Retired traffic lights

References 

Australia
Signs

it:Segnaletica stradale in Australia
hu:Útjelző táblák Ausztráliában
bg:Пътни знаци в Австралия
cs:Dopravní značky v Austrálii